The statues of Saints Barbara, Margaret and Elizabeth are outdoor sculptures by Ferdinand Brokoff, Jan Brokoff, and Michael Brokoff, installed on the south side of the Charles Bridge in Prague, Czech Republic.

External links

 

Christian sculptures
Monuments and memorials in Prague
Sculptures of women in Prague
Statues on the Charles Bridge